Nazirrudin bin Haji Ismail (born 27 December 1998) is a Bruneian footballer who plays as a midfielder for DPMM FC of the Singapore Premier League and the Brunei national football team.

Club career
Nazirrudin attended Brunei Sports School in his youth years. He was also a trainee with Tabuan Muda, the youth scheme of the National Football Association of Brunei Darussalam, from 2013 to 2016. He played for Tabuan Muda teams in the 2015 Brunei Premier League and the 2016 Brunei Super League. He moved to league powerhouses Indera SC in 2017 and contributed three goals for Indera in the 2017–18 Brunei Super League season, the first one coming in his first league appearance in a 2–1 defeat to Tabuan Muda 'A'. He gained a Brunei FA Cup winner's medal by beating MS PDB in the final on 1 April 2018. He also won the following Sumbangsih Cup on 20 October.

In the 2018–19 season Nazirrudin stood out to become one of the most important players in the talented Indera side, converting to a left winger role opposite Aminuddin Zakwan Tahir and reaching double figures for goals scored. Finishing fourth in the table, Indera qualified for the 2020 AFC Cup as the highest team in the league that has obtained an AFC Cup Club License. Nazirrudin made his continental cup debut against Yangon United in a 1–6 loss on 22 January 2020.

After sitting out of footballing action in 2021, he laced up for his employer's football team MS PPDB for the 2022 Brunei FA Cup. He scored two goals on his debut in a 9–0 rout of MSN United on 14 August.

On 28 February, Nazirrudin signed with DPMM FC for the 2023 Singapore Premier League season. He made his debut coming on for Hakeme Yazid Said in the 12th minute of stoppage time in a 3–4 loss to Balestier Khalsa on 10 March.

International career
Nazirrudin's first international tournament was the 2014 AFC U-16 Championship qualification matches held in Laos in September 2013, under new Brunei Under-16s coach Stephen Ng Heng Seng. He scored on his debut in a 4–1 victory over Guam, but the team were subsequently handed defeats by Malaysia, South Korea and hosts Laos.

While still being in the Tabuan Muda under-18s setup, Nazirrudin was invited to train with the second-string national side to face Singapore on 6 June 2015 which ended 5–1 to the Lions. He laced up for the Brunei under-19s at the 2015 AFF U-19 Youth Championship in August of that year. He made two starts and four total appearances in as many games, all ending in defeat.

In 2017, Nazirrudin was chosen for the Brunei under-23 squad competing in the 2018 AFC U-23 Championship qualification matches in July 2017 and the 29th SEA Games the following month. For the AFC qualifying tournament held in Myanmar, he played only the first match against Australia in a 2–0 loss. He was largely on the sidelines for the SEA Games tournament, making his only start in the dead rubber match against Singapore, which ended in a 1–0 loss.

Nazirrudin played with the Brunei under-21s as hosts of the 2018 Hassanal Bolkiah Trophy in April, featuring in all of their games. In the second group game against Thailand, he came on in the second half and scored the winner in a 2–1 victory. Nevertheless, two slim defeats in the other games meant that the Young Wasps were eliminated in the group stage of the competition.

In 2019, Nazirrudin was selected for the under-23s for the 2020 AFC U-23 Championship qualification matches held in Vietnam in March 2019. He was overlooked for Abdul Hariz Herman in the first two games which were heavy defeats to Vietnam and Thailand. He started the final game against Indonesia national under-23 football team and after substitute Azim Izamuddin Suhaimi scored a penalty to make the game 2–1 with five minutes from normal time remaining and Garuda Muda reduced to 10 men after the dismissal of their goalkeeper, Nazirrudin elected to take a penalty deep in injury time against replacement goalkeeper Dimas Drajad and had his effort saved by the opposition striker.

Nazirrudin was selected for the full national team at the 2022 World Cup qualification matches against Mongolia in June 2022. He made his international debut right from the start in the first leg, which was a 2–0 defeat in Ulaanbaatar. Five days later in the return leg, Nazirrudin kept his place as Brunei won the game 2–1 but was eliminated from the 2022 World Cup and the 2023 Asian Cup on aggregate.

At the end of 2019 Nazirrudin was called up for the 30th SEA Games in the Philippines from November to December 2019. The team featured Faiq Bolkiah as captain and Adi Said as the main attacking player, with the young prodigy Hakeme Yazid Said also brought into the squad. Ultimately the team failed to gel and suffered five embarrassing defeats at the group stage, with the final fixture being a 7–0 mauling by the Young Lions, half of the goals coming in the last five minutes.

Missing out on national team callups in early 2022, Nazirrudin finally returned to the side in September 2022 for a tri-nation tournament involving the Maldives and Laos hosted by Brunei. He came on for Nur Asyraffahmi Norsamri in the second half in a 0–3 loss to the Maldives on 21 September. He started the next game against Laos six days later, and capitalised on a mistake by debutant Phounin Xayyasone to score the only goal of the match, bringing new head coach Mario Rivera his first victory. He made the starting eleven for the second match against Timor-Leste at the 2022 AFF Mitsubishi Electric Cup qualification held in Brunei in early November. Brunei recorded a 6–3 aggregate win to progress to the tournament proper the following month. He was brought on as a substitute against the Philippines on 23 December in a 5–1 defeat. He then made the starting lineup in the games against Indonesia and Cambodia, both ending in losses for the Wasps.

International goals

Personal life
Nazirrudin has an elder brother Nizamuddin who plays for MS PPDB and had been a Brunei youth international.

Honours
Indera SC
 Brunei FA Cup: 2017–18
 Piala Sumbangsih: 2019

References

External links

1998 births
Living people
Association football midfielders
Bruneian footballers
Indera SC players
DPMM FC players
Singapore Premier League players
Brunei international footballers